Marina Village may refer to:

Marina Village, California
Marina Village (Abu Dhabi)
Marina Village (Bridgeport, Connecticut)